is an underground railway station in the city of Nagano, Japan, operated by the private railway operating company Nagano Electric Railway.

Lines
Zenkōjishita Station is a station on the Nagano Electric Railway Nagano Line and is 1.6 kilometers from the terminus of the line at Nagano Station.

Station layout
The station is an underground station consisting of two opposed side platforms serving two tracks. The station is staffed.

Platforms

Adjacent stations

History
The station opened on 28 June 1926. It was reopened as an underground station on 26 March 1977.

Passenger statistics
In fiscal 2016, the station was used by an average of 670 passengers daily (boarding passengers only).

Surrounding area
Joto Elementary School

See also
 List of railway stations in Japan

References

External links

 

Railway stations in Japan opened in 1926
Railway stations in Nagano (city)
Nagano Electric Railway